Turbine locomotive may refer to:

 Gas turbine locomotive, uses a gas turbine as a power source and drives the wheels via a mechanical transmission
 Gas turbine-electric locomotive, uses a gas turbine to power an alternator, which in turn powers traction motors
 Steam turbine locomotive, uses a boiler and steam turbine as a power source

Locomotives